The China Council for the Promotion of Peaceful National Reunification (CCPPNR) is an umbrella organization, founded in 1988, by the United Front Work Department of the Chinese Communist Party (CCP) to promote unification between mainland China and Taiwan on terms defined solely by the People's Republic of China. Unification is couched in a one country, two systems framework, though critics categorize it as annexation. According to scholar Anne-Marie Brady, in addition to promoting unification, "the organization also engages in a range of activities which support Chinese foreign policy goals, including block-voting and fund-raising for ethnic Chinese political candidates who agree to support their organization's agenda." The main council oversees over 200 chapters in multiple countries.

The group holds an annual Overseas Chinese World Conference for Promoting Peaceful Reunification of China. This event has been held in multiple countries and is coordinated by local councils and other front organizations linked to the United Front Work Department. The council is chaired by Wang Yang and its vice-chair is You Quan.

Branches

Australia 
In 2019, it was reported that the Australia-based branch, the Australia Council for Promotion of Peaceful Reunification (ACPPRC), was not registered as a foreign agent even though it acts to influence Australian politics. The ACPPRC was previously headed by Huang Xiangmo who was subsequently banned from entering Australia due to national security concerns.

United States 
In the United States, multiple local councils exist and a national-level council is registered as a non-profit called the National Association for China's Peaceful Unification (NACPU). NACPU is also registered under the Foreign Agents Registration Act (FARA). In 2019, U.S. congressional representative Judy Chu was named "honorary chairwoman" of a branch council called the Forums for Peaceful Reunification of China, an organization opposed to Taiwanese independence.

In 2019, Li "Cindy" Yang, a vice-president of the organization's Florida-based council, was investigated by the Federal Bureau of Investigation for allegedly "peddling access" to Mar-a-Lago.

In October 2020, NACPU was designated a foreign mission by the United States Department of State.

Reaction

Scholars and observers have noted that the council and its events are part of the political influence agenda of the Chinese Communist Party and that Taiwan has never been under the control of the CCP.

In September 2020, U.S. Secretary of State Mike Pompeo stated that the State Department had begun reviewing the activities of the CCPPNR in the U.S. In October 2020, the State Department designated the NACPU a foreign mission of the People's Republic of China.

In 2022, the U.S. National Counterintelligence and Security Center issued a warning notice to state and local leaders citing the NACPU, the Chinese People's Association for Friendship with Foreign Countries, and the United Front Work Department.

See also

One-China policy
Two Chinas
United front in Taiwan
Cross-Strait relations

References

External links 
 

Cross-Strait relations
Overseas Chinese organisations
Organizations associated with the Chinese Communist Party
Chinese propaganda organisations
Chinese intelligence agencies
Foreign relations of China
United front (China)